The Switzerland Of Ohio Local School District is a rural school district located in southeastern Ohio in the United States. The largest geographic school district in the state, it covers all of Monroe County and parts of Belmont and Noble counties, a total of 546 square miles. As of 2017, it educates approximately 2,700 students annually; they attend five elementary schools, three high schools, and one career center. In July 2021, Mr. Phil Ackerman took over as superintendent.

The Switzerland of Ohio Local School District consists of:
 Elementary schools
Beallsville Elementary School in Beallsville, Ohio in Monroe County 
Skyvue Elementary School in Graysville, Ohio in Monroe County
Woodsfield Elementary School in Woodsfield, Ohio in Monroe County 
River Elementary School in Hannibal, Ohio in Monroe County
Powhatan Elementary School in Powhatan Point, Ohio in Belmont County, Ohio
 High schools
Beallsville High School in Beallsville, Monroe County
River High School in Hannibal, Ohio in Monroe County
Monroe Central High School in Woodsfield, Monroe County 
 Career center
Swiss Hills Career Center in Woodsfield, Ohio in Monroe County, Ohio

References

External links
 Switzerland of Ohio Local School District

School districts in Ohio
Education in Monroe County, Ohio
Education in Belmont County, Ohio
Education in Noble County, Ohio